Chris Broad may refer to:

 Chris Broad (cricketer) (born 1957), English former cricketer, broadcaster, and cricket official
 Chris Broad (filmmaker), British YouTuber known for his channel Abroad in Japan